The Czechoslovak People's Army (ČSLA) was the armed forces of the Communist Party of Czechoslovakia (KSČ) and the Czechoslovak Socialist Republic from 1954 until 1989. From 1955 it was a member force of the Warsaw Pact. On 14 March 1990 the Army's name was officially reverted back to the Czechoslovak Army removing the adjective "People's" from the name. The Czechoslovak Army was split into the Army of the Czech Republic and the Armed Forces of the Slovak Republic after the dissolution of Czechoslovakia on 1 January 1993.

Transition to Communist rule
On 25 May 1945 the Provisional organization of the Czechoslovak armed forces was approved, according to which there was a reorganization of the Czechoslovak army. Soldiers who had fought against Nazism on all fronts of World War II gradually returned. The territory of Czechoslovakia was divided into four military areas in which emerged gradually over 16 infantry divisions, which complemented the Tank Corps and Artillery Division. The Czechoslovak I Corps which had served under Soviet control became the 1st Czechoslovak Army, before becoming the 1st Military Area. Initial optimism about the plans to rebuild the army was replaced by disillusionment, stemming from a broken post-war economy and the lack of human and material resources. The Czechoslovak Army after the war was commissioned to expel Germans and Hungarians, and was also involved in helping the national economy. In addition, units of the National Security Corps participated in the fighting against the Organisation of Ukrainian Nationalists. After 1948, when the Communist Party of Czechoslovakia took power, there were significant changes in the military. More than half of the officers began to experience persecution as well as soldiers, and many were forced to leave. The political processes focused mainly on soldiers who fought in World War II in Western Europe, but paradoxically there was also persecution of soldiers fighting the war on the Eastern Front. The army came fully under the power of the Communist Party and in 1950 there was a major reorganization of the Soviet model, and the military areas were disbanded. In 1951 there was signed between Czechoslovakia and the Soviet Union the Agreement on the manner and terms of settlement for the supplied equipment and material provided by the USSR loan of almost 44 million rubles for the purchase of military equipment, especially aircraft and radars. There has been an increase in proliferation and increasing the number of servicemen of the army, which since 1953 reached over 300,000.

The final Report of the Commission of Inquiry of the Federal Assembly for clarification of events of 17 November 1989 characterized the Czechoslovak People's Army as follows: "... the Czechoslovak Army, next to the SNB (the people's police force) and LM (the paramilitary workers militia), was understood as one of the direct power tools designed for control over society and for the immediate management of internal political problems; the Communist Party by means of a vast staff of the Main Political Administration (HPS) of ČSLA penetrated as far as into the lowest units and in this way virtually ensured its absolute influence on the Army." During the Velvet Revolution, Communist Minister of National Defence Milán Václavík proposed to use the army against demonstrators, but his suggestion was not heeded.

Components 

The ČSLA was composed of Ground Forces, Air Forces and Air Defence Forces, under the direction of the General Staff.

Ground Forces 
Of the approximately 201,000 personnel on active duty in the ČSLA in 1987, about 145,000, or about 72 percent, served in the ground forces (commonly referred to as the army). About 100,000 of these were conscripts. There were two military districts, Western and Eastern. A 1989 listing of forces shows two Czechoslovak armies in the west, the 1st Army at Příbram with one tank division and three motor rifle divisions, the 4th Army at Písek with two tank divisions and two motor rifle divisions. In the Eastern Military District, there were two tank divisions, the 13th and 14th, with a supervisory headquarters at Trenčín in the Slovak part of the country.

Czechoslovak military doctrine prescribed large tank columns spearheading infantry assaults. While the armoured columns secured objectives, the infantry would provide close support with mortars, snipers, anti-tank guns and medium artillery. The majority of the soldiers in the Ground Forces were recruited through conscription, compulsory military service of 24 months for all males between 18 and 27.

Air Force 
The Air and Air Defence Forces of the CPA celebrated 17 September 1944, as the birth date of their force. On that date, a fighter regiment, manned by Czechoslovak personnel, the :cs:První československý samostatný stíhací letecký pluk   - 1st Czechoslovak Independent Fighter Aviation Regiment - flew out for Slovak soil to take part in the Slovak National Uprising. This first regiment grew into the 1st Czechoslovak Mixed Air Division, which fought with the Soviets. Yet it was only six years after the war, in 1951, when Czechoslovak units began receiving aircraft - jet fighters - to create a combat capability.

The Czechoslovak Air Force was fully equipped with supersonic jet fighters, attack helicopters, air defence systems and electronic tracking equipment.

Air Defence Forces 
The Army's air defence (PVOS, Protivzdušná obrana státu) had anti-aircraft missile units, fighter interceptor aircraft and radar and direction-finding units, known, in accordance with Soviet terminology, as radio-technical units.

Means of higher military education 

 Antonin Zapotocky Military Technological Academy (Brno)
 Klement Gottwald Military Academy (Prague)
 Political Military Academy in Bratislava
 Ludvík Svoboda Military Ground Forces University in Vyškov
 Military Air Forces University "Slovak National Uprising" in Košice
 Military Technical School "Czechoslovak-Soviet Friendship" in Liptovský Mikuláš
 Military Topographic Institute in Dobruška
 Military Cartographic Institute in Harmanec
 Military Geographic Institute in Prague
 Military Medical Institute in Hradec Králov

Characteristics 
One of the official marches of the ČSLA was the March of the Submachine Gunners ("Pochod samopalníků") by Jan Fadrhons.

Organs of the military press 

 Narodnaya Oborona newspaper
 Lidova Armada (People's Army) magazine
 Czechoslovak Warrior magazine
 Zapisnik (Notepad) magazines

Cultural and propaganda institutions 

 Professional Sport Army Center DUKLA in Banská Bystrica
 Army Art Ensemble "Vít Nejedlý"
 Central Military Band of the ČSLA
 Military Art Ensemble "Captain Ján Nálepka"
 Czechoslovak War Film Studio 
The band served as one of the ideological tools of the Communist Party of Czechoslovakia from the 1950s until November 1989.

Holidays and celebrations 
The ČSLA had the following professional holidays:

 15 January - Day of the Rocket Forces and Artillery, the anniversary of the actions of the 1st Czechoslovak Army Corps and the 38th Army in a battle near the Polish city of Jaslo on 15 January 1945.
 6 October - Day of the Czechoslovak People's Army, the anniversary of the Battle of the Dukla Pass on 6 October 1944.
 17 September - Aviation Day of the Czechoslovak People's Army

During the period of the Czechoslovak Socialist Republic, regular Victory Day Parades were held by the Czechoslovak People's Army in Letná. The first parade took place in 1951 and, since, they were held every five years on 9 May up until 1990. The parade also marked the Prague uprising. The last of these parades took place in 1985. Kde domov můj and Nad Tatrou sa blýska (the Czechoslovakian national anthem) were performed by the massed bands on parade before being followed by the State Anthem of the Soviet Union. Parades were also held in Bratislava as well.

Equipment

Ground Forces

Air and Air Defence Forces

Ranks of the Czechoslovak People's Army

Enlisted and non-commissioned officers 
 Vojín – Private, Airman
 Svobodník – Private First Class, Airman First Class
 Desátník – Corporal, Senior Airman
 Četař – Sergeant
 Rotný – Staff Sergeant
 Staršina – Platoon Sergeant, Flight sergeant (part of the rank system 1948–1959)
 Rotmistr – Sergeant First Class, Technical Sergeant
 Nadrotmistr – Master Sergeant
 Štábní rotmistr – First Sergeant

Warrant officers 
 Podpraporčík – First Warrant Officer 
 Praporčík – Warrant officer
 Nadpraporčík – Senior Warrant Officer
 Štábní praporčík – Chief Warrant Officer (abolished 1949)

Officers 
 Podporučík – Sub-lieutenant 
 Poručík – Second lieutenant
 Nadporučík – First lieutenant
 Kapitán – Captain
 Štábní kapitán – Senior Captain (abolished 1952)
 Major
 Podplukovník – Lieutenant colonel
 Plukovník – Colonel
 Brigádní generál – Brigade General (abolished 1950)
 Divizní generál – Divisional General (abolished 1950)
 Generálmajor – Major General
 Generálporučík – Lieutenant General
 Sborový generál – Corps General (abolished 1950)
 Generálplukovník – Colonel General
 Armádní generál – General of the Army

See also 
 Army of the Czech Republic
 Armed Forces of the Slovak Republic
 Holešov barracks incident, paratroopers, 1968

References 

 Defense Intelligence Agency, National Intelligence Survey: Armed Forces, May 1974 (declassified in accordance with the Freedom of Information Act)
 
 Rice, Condoleezza. The Soviet Union and the Czechoslovak Army, 1948-1983: Uncertain Allegiance. Princeton University Press, 2014.
 Steven J. Zaloga and James Loop, Soviet Bloc Elite Forces, London: Osprey, 1985

External links 
 ČSLA (Czechoslovak People's Army)  – professional website dedicated to this former military 
 Československá armáda (Czechoslovak Army)  – website about Czechoslovak and Czech forces since 1918 
 Weapons and Equipment of the Czechoslovak People's Army 1948–1989
 od ČSLA k AČR I.
 Czechoslovak Military Parade 1985

Military of Czechoslovakia
Warsaw Pact
Disbanded armies
Military units and formations of the Cold War
Czechoslovak Socialist Republic